Blood World is the fourth studio album by Australian Christian extreme metal band Mortification, released in 1994. The songs "Your Life", "J.G.S.H." and "Love Song" were included on the Tourniquet/Mortification Collector's Edition CD Single in 1994; the disc also contained a segment discussing Mortification's history, from the video release of Live Planetarium, and material from American Christian metal band Tourniquet's album Vanishing Lessons. Blood World was a commercial hit and the band's most successful album.

The album focuses more on thrash metal, with classic metal, groove metal and hardcore punk influences, and contains less death metal influences than previous albums. Instead of Steve Rowe's growls, the album mainly contains his shouting-style singing, but growls do make occasional appearances.

Reception 
According to Australian Music Online, "the strange combination of extreme styles began setting Mortification apart from the crowd of same sounding bands and widened the band's audience as they became quickly recognised as innovators and not imitators." Blood World received rave reviews in America and Europe. Horror Infernal Magazine gave the album 13 out of 13 points.

Reissue 
A reissue of Blood World was released in 2008 by Metal Mind Productions and contained four bonus tracks. A second reissue, by Soundmass, was released in 2020 and contained four bonus tracks.

Track listing 

 previously recorded on Live Planetarium (1993)

 song from Relentless (2002)
 songs from Live Without Fear (1996)

Personnel

Mortification
Steve Rowe – vocals, bass guitar
Michael Carlisle – guitar
Phil Gibson – drums

Production
Mark McCormack, Mortification – producer, mixing, recording

Additional personnel
Mortification – cover concept
Dave Berryman – photography
Matthew Duffy – art direction
Jack Wedell – design (original version)
Chris Dean – cover artwork (original version)
Tobias Jäpel – cover artwork (2020 version)
Scott Waters (Ultimatum) – layout, design (2020 version)

References

Mortification (band) albums
1994 albums